Lac de Vitalaca is a small lake in the Monte Renoso massif in the Corse-du-Sud department of France. It is at an altitude of 1,777 metres, and is surrounded by high mountains.

Location

Lac de Vitalaca is in the commune of Bastelica.
It is in the Monte Renoso massif between the  Punta Capanella to the west and the  Bocca della Calle to the east.
The Prunelli river, which originates in Lac de Bracca, enters the north end of the lake and leaves the south end.
The lake is surrounded by pozzines, or peat lawns crossed by streams.
It is encircled by high mountains and has a dramatic panorama towards the south.

See also

List of waterbodies of Corse-du-Sud

Notes

Citations

Sources

Lakes of Corsica